Murilo Setin Sartori (born 18 May 2002) is a Brazilian swimmer.

At the age of 16, participating in the 2018 Summer Youth Olympics in Buenos Aires, he won a silver medal in the Boys' 4 × 100 metre freestyle relay.  He also finished 6th at the Boys' 200 metre freestyle. At the age of 17, he won a bronze medal in the 200 metre freestyle at the 2019 FINA World Junior Swimming Championships.

He competed in the men's 200 metre freestyle at the 2020 Summer Olympics at age 19. He made a time of 1:47.11, finishing in 24th place overall.  Sartori also made it to the Men's 4 × 200 metre freestyle relay final, finishing in 8th place. He has committed to competing collegiately for the University of Louisville.

At the 2021 FINA World Swimming Championships (25 m) in Abu Dhabi, United Arab Emirates, in the Men's 4 × 200 metre freestyle relay, the Brazilian relay, composed by Sartori, Fernando Scheffer, Kaique Alves and Breno Correia, again obtained a medal, now bronze, maintaining the good performance of 2018, when Brazil won the gold beating the world record. He also finished 10th in the Men's 200 metre freestyle.

At the 2022 World Aquatics Championships held in Budapest, Hungary, in the men's 4 × 200 metre freestyle relay event, the Brazilian team, composed by Sartori, Fernando Scheffer, Vinicius Assunção and Breno Correia, broke the South American record twice in a row, in the heats, and the finals, reaching a time of 7:04.69 and obtaining an unprecedented fourth place in the long-distance World Championships. The Brazilian team just didn't get a medal because of the exceptional performance of Tom Dean when closing the British relay.

References

External links
 

2002 births
Living people
Brazilian male freestyle swimmers
Olympic swimmers of Brazil
Swimmers at the 2020 Summer Olympics
Swimmers at the 2018 Summer Youth Olympics
People from Americana, São Paulo
Sportspeople from São Paulo (state)